Ari Seth Cohen is an American photographer, filmmaker, and fashion blogger. He is the founder of "Advanced Style" which produces media including a blog, book, and film about fashion in people over the age of 60.

Early life 
Cohen was raised in San Diego and attended San Diego Jewish Academy. He majored in art history at University of Washington. He developed a close relationship to his grandmothers Helen Cohen and Bluma Levine.

Career 
Cohen studied art history at the University of Washington. After graduating he spent several years working various jobs in art sales, counseling, and retail management while helping to take care of his grandmother Bluma. He first began photographing after his maternal grandmother died in 2008. She encouraged Cohen to move to New York City where she had completed graduate school at Barnard College in the 1930s. To cope with the loss, Cohen began street photography of people over the age of 60. This led to the creation of his Advanced Style blog in 2008. He features the style, creativity, and wisdom of fashion-minded individuals over the age of 60. In July 2015, Cohen relocated to Los Angeles. He has released three books featuring portraits and interviews and a coloring book as well. In 2014 Cohen released the Advanced Style documentary, which he made with director Lina Plioplyte, featuring the lives and style of many of his New York muses. The film played in theaters internationally and eventually on Netflix for several years after. Cohen has been invited to speak about his work all around the world, including a Ted X Amsterdam talk in 2014 and the Chicago Humanities Festival in 2020. Designer, Marc Jacobs cited Advanced Style for being the inspiration behind his fall 2012 collection and New York Times fashion director, Vanessa Friedman credited Cohen with starting a movement towards more inclusion of older models in the fashion industry. His 2018 book, Advanced Love, includes 40 profiles of elderly couples.

Selected works

References

External links
 
 

Living people
Year of birth missing (living people)
Artists from San Diego
Photographers from California
21st-century American photographers
Street photographers
Fashion influencers
American male bloggers
American bloggers
Filmmakers from California
Jewish American artists
Jewish bloggers
21st-century American Jews